The 1400 Guineas Stakes was a flat horse race in Great Britain open to thoroughbreds aged four years. It was run at Newmarket and was one of the most important races of the second half of the 18th century.

History
The 1400 Guineas was established in 1757 to be first run on the Monday before the first Thursday in October 1758. It was established by the 2nd Marquess of Rockingham, Marquess of Granby, 2nd Earl of Northumberland, 1st Earl of Gower, Sir James Lowther, Thomas Panton and Jenison Shafto. They agreed the race was to be run over the Beacon course at Newmarket and would be open to four-year-old colts and fillies. They paid a 200 guineas subscription each to enter their horse. Colts would carry 8 st 7 lb and fillies 8 st 4 lb.

The race was initially to be run for five consecutive years from 1758, but was subsequently renewed in 1763. The weights were changed in 1768, with colts carrying 8 st 10 lb and fillies 8 st 7 lb. The race was discontinued after 1782 and a similar race was started for three-year-olds in 1784.

Winners

See also
 Horseracing in Great Britain
 List of British flat horse races

References

 
 

Flat races in Great Britain
Newmarket Racecourse
Discontinued horse races
Recurring sporting events established in 1758